UFC Fight Night: Lewis vs. dos Santos (also known as UFC Fight Night 146 or UFC on ESPN+ 4) was a mixed martial arts event produced by the Ultimate Fighting Championship that was held on March 9, 2019 at Intrust Bank Arena in Wichita, Kansas.

Background
The event marked the promotion's first visit to Kansas.

A heavyweight bout between former UFC Heavyweight Champion Junior dos Santos and former title challenger Derrick Lewis served as the event headliner.

As a result of the cancellation of UFC 233, the women's bantamweight bout between former Invicta FC Bantamweight Champion and UFC Women's Featherweight Championship challenger Yana Kunitskaya and Marion Reneau was rescheduled for this event.

Daniel Spitz was expected to fight Jeff Hughes at the event. However, Spitz pulled out of the bout on February 16 citing injury and was replaced by Maurice Greene. Hughes and Greene previously met in the regional circuit in April 2018.

Results

Bonus awards
The following fighters received $50,000 bonuses:
Fight of the Night: Junior dos Santos vs. Derrick Lewis
Performance of the Night: Niko Price and Beneil Dariush

See also 

 List of UFC events
 2019 in UFC
 List of current UFC fighters

References 

UFC Fight Night
2019 in mixed martial arts
Mixed martial arts in Kansas
Sports competitions in Wichita, Kansas
March 2019 sports events in the United States
2019 in sports in Kansas